Daniel, Dan, or Danny Thompson may refer to:

In arts and media
 Danny Thompson (born 1939), English double bass player
 Danny Ray Thompson (1947-2020), American jazz saxophonist with Sun Ra's Arkestra
 Danny Thompson (drummer) (born 1967), drummer for American punk rock band Face to Face
 Daniel Thompson (poet) (1935–2004), American poet and activist in Cleveland, Ohio
 Daniel Pierce Thompson (1795–1868), American novelist and lawyer in Vermont
 Daniel V. Thompson (1902–1980), American art historian and translator

In sport
 Danny Thompson (baseball) (1947–1976), American baseball infielder
 Dan Thompson (footballer) (born 1994), English footballer
 Danny Thompson (racing driver) (born 1948), American racing driver
 Dan Thompson (swimmer) (born 1956), Canadian butterfly swimmer
 Dan Thompson (speedway rider), (born 2004), English speedway rider

Other people
 Danny Thompson (bounty hunter), American bounty hunter in the reality series Airplane Repo
 Daniel Thompson (inventor) (1921–2015), Canadian-born American inventor and entrepreneur

See also
 Danny Thomson (born 1991), Scottish footballer